John Leonsor "J. L." Boake (September 24, 1841July 22, 1912) was an American professional baseball umpire in the National Association who umpired his only game on May 4, 1871, which was the first game in professional baseball league history. Boake was the home plate umpire when the Fort Wayne Kekiongas defeated the Cleveland Forest Citys, 2–0.

He was born in Philadelphia, Pennsylvania and died in Covington, Kentucky. Boake is buried at Spring Grove Cemetery in Cincinnati, Ohio.

References

External links
Retrosheet

1841 births
1912 deaths
Major League Baseball umpires
Burials at Spring Grove Cemetery
19th-century baseball umpires
Sportspeople from Philadelphia